Anstruther Burghs was a district of burghs constituency of the House of Commons of the Parliament of Great Britain from 1708 to 1800 and of the House of Commons of the Parliament of the United Kingdom from 1801 to 1832.

It elected one Member of Parliament (MP).

Creation
The British parliamentary constituency was created in 1708 following the Acts of Union 1707 and replaced the former Parliament of Scotland burgh constituencies of Anstruther Easter, Anstruther Wester, Crail, Kilrenny and Pittenweem.

Boundaries
The constituency comprised the burghs of Anstruther Easter, Anstruther Wester, Pittenweem, Crail, and Kilrenny, in the county of Fife.

In 1832, the burghs were combined with the Fife burghs of Cupar and St Andrews, which were previously components of Perth Burghs, to form St Andrews Burghs.

Members of Parliament

Election results

Elections in the 1830s

References

Sources 

Historic parliamentary constituencies in Scotland (Westminster)
Constituencies of the Parliament of the United Kingdom established in 1708
Constituencies of the Parliament of the United Kingdom disestablished in 1832
Fife
Anstruther